Erkin Qaraqalpaqstan (Free Karakalpakstan) is the main Karakalpak language newspaper, published in Uzbekistan. As of 2007, it printed 2700 copies three times a week, down from 66,000 five times a week in 1975.

Former names:
1924: قاراقالپاق ٔيرکين (Free Karakalpak)
1929: Mijnetkeş qaraqalpak (Working Karapalpak)
1932: Qьzьl Qaraqalpaƣastan/Қызыл Қарақалпақстан (Red Karakalpakstan)
1950: Совет Қарақалпақстаны (Soviet Karakalpakstan)
1990: Еркин Қарақалпақстан (Free Karakalpakstan)

References

1924 establishments in the Soviet Union
Karakalpak-language newspapers
Newspapers established in 1924
Newspapers published in Uzbekistan
Newspapers published in the Soviet Union